The NACDA Directors' Cup, known for sponsorship reasons as the NACDA Learfield Directors' Cup or simply as the Directors' Cup, is an award given annually by the National Association of Collegiate Directors of Athletics to the colleges and universities in the United States with the most success in collegiate athletics. Points for the NACDA Directors' Cup are based on order of finish in various championships sponsored by the National Collegiate Athletic Association (NCAA) and the National Association of Intercollegiate Athletics (NAIA) or, in the case of Division I Football, media-based polls. A first-place finish in a sport earns 100 points, second place 90 points, third place 85 points, fourth place 80 points, and lesser values for lower finishes (exact numbers beyond fourth place depend on the sport and division; see chart). The award originated in 1993 and was presented to NCAA Division I schools only. In 1995 it was extended to Division II, Division III, and NAIA schools as well, then extended further to junior colleges in 2011 based on standings from the NATYCAA Cup. Each division receives its own award.

The physical award is a Waterford crystal trophy. Prior to 2003, the sponsor of the NACDA Directors' Cup was retail merchandiser Sears, and the award was known as the Sears Cup. Beginning in the 2003–04 season, the sponsor was the United States Sports Academy. In 2007–08, Learfield Sports assumed the sponsorship of the Directors' Cup. Learfield Sports rebranded to Learfield IMG College in 2016 and to simply Learfield in 2021.

History 
The University of North Carolina won the award in its inaugural year, but then Stanford University won the Division I award for 25 straight years until the streak was broken in 2020–21 by the University of Texas. Texas repeated as champions in 2022.

In Division II, UC Davis won six of the first eight awards, but its athletic program moved to Division I in 2003 and Grand Valley State has won 14 of the 17 awards since. 

Williams College has had by far the most success in Division III, having won the Cup 22 of the 25 times it has been awarded for that division. 

The NAIA division was dominated by Simon Fraser University of British Columbia in its early years, but in 2002, SFU transferred most of its sports programs to Canada's college athletics federation, then known as Canadian Interuniversity Sport and now as U Sports. SFU left U Sports in 2011 and has since become a full member of NCAA Division II. From 2004–05 to 2011–12, Azusa Pacific University assumed the mantle at the NAIA level, winning eight consecutive championships before moving to NCAA Division II in the 2012–13 season. Oklahoma City University has been the most successful school since that year, with three Directors' Cups.

For two year colleges, Iowa Central Community College has been the most successful school, winning five of the 10 titles.

Scoring system
See chart for exact point breakdown for each sport and division.

 NCAA Division I: Counts top 19 sports at each school with the following breakdowns:
 Four of which must be baseball, men's basketball, women's basketball and women's volleyball
 The next highest 15 sports scored for each institution, regardless of gender, will be used in the standings (except men's water polo)
 For FBS Football: the top 25 teams are awarded points based on their final rank in the Coaches Poll. 26th place is considered a tie between every non-ranked bowl winner, and the next available rank is considered a tie between every non-ranked bowl loser.
 NCAA Division II: Counts top 15 sports at each school with the following breakdowns:
 Four of which must be baseball, men's basketball, women's basketball and women's volleyball
 The next highest 11 sports scored for each institution, regardless of gender, will be used in the standings (except men's water polo)
 NCAA Division III: Counts top 18 sports at each school with the following breakdowns:
 Four of which must be men's basketball, men's soccer, women's basketball and women's soccer
 The next highest 14 sports scored for each institution, regardless of gender, will be used in the standings (except men's water polo)
 NAIA: Counts top 13 sports at each school with the following breakdowns:
 Four of which must be men's basketball, men's soccer, women's basketball and women's volleyball
 The next highest 9 sports scored for each institution, regardless of gender, will be used in the standings
 Junior/Community Colleges: The highest scoring institution in the NATYCAA Cup standings among the NJCAA Scholarship, NJCAA Non-Scholarship, and State Associations divisions will be declared the Directors' Cup winner.

Tiebreaking 
If two teams have the same number of points at the end of the season, the tiebreaker is the number of national championships won. If still tied the next tiebreaker is the number of second-place finishes, then third-place finishes and so on until one team wins. The tiebreaker is only used for first place.

Criticism 
The scoring structure has been criticized for several reasons, especially due to the number of sports counted per division. Although the number of sports counted in the scoring is based on the average number of sports sponsored by a team in that division, certain schools offer many more or many less sports than that. For example, Stanford's dominance at the Division I level is largely attributed to them sponsoring 36 sports teams, the most in Division I outside of the Ivy League, which does not grant athletic scholarships. This gives Stanford many more opportunities to win titles than most other schools, especially considering that many of the sports Stanford sponsors are not played by very many other schools, all but guaranteeing a substantial number of points for the few schools that do (NACDA awards slightly fewer points for teams that finish lower than fourth in sports with less competition, but the top four teams no matter the sport always receive 100, 90, 85, and 80 points respectively).

Another common criticism is the fact that four sports are required to be counted despite some schools not sponsoring those sports. For example while baseball must be used as one of the 19 sports counted for a Division I team, there are 51 Division I schools who do not sponsor baseball as of the 2022 NCAA baseball season; this gives those 51 schools an inherent disadvantage as they must count a sport for which they are guaranteed to receive zero points.

Other reasons for criticism are over the way NACDA awards points in "National Collegiate" sports, which are sports where Division I, II, and III schools all compete directly against each other instead of being separated. The NCAA considers National Collegiate championships equivalent to Division I, therefore Division III schools are allowed to grant athletic scholarships in those sports, but NACDA counts points earned in National Collegiate competitions toward whatever division a team primarily competes in. Similarly, there are many otherwise-Division III schools who compete in Division I for only men's ice hockey (despite Division III having its own ice hockey tournament), so there have been instances where two different Division III teams earn 100 points in the sport.

A final reason of criticism is over men's water polo being the only sport with an NCAA championship that NACDA does not award points for, with many people wanting it to be included and many other people wanting more unpopular sports such as fencing or men's gymnastics to also not be counted.

Multiple suggestions have been made to change the scoring system. Some of the most popular of these include making each sport worth a proportional number of points to the number of schools that compete in it, to get rid of the limit on the number of sports counted then divide a school's total points by the number of sports it sponsors, and to count the median number of teams per division instead of the average (the median number of teams at a Division I school, for example, is 16; substantially lower than the 19 sports that are counted). However, none of these suggestions have ever been seriously considered by NACDA.

Past scoring system 
From the creation of the award until the 2017–18 season the scoring was as follows:

 NCAA Division I: Counted up to 20 total sports at each school, with a maximum of 10 sports counted for each gender
 NCAA Division II: Counted up to 14 total sports at each school, with a maximum of 7 sports counted for each gender
 NCAA Division III: Counted up to 18 total sports at each school, with a maximum of 9 sports counted for each gender
 NAIA: Counted up to 12 total sports at each school, with a maximum of 6 sports counted for each gender
 Junior/Community Colleges: Same as current

Past winners

 Results for years and schools shown in italics represent current standings and are not yet final.
 These results are for the "final" standings, calculated after spring sports end.

NCAA Division I

Stanford and Florida have finished ranked within the top 10 every season.  Stanford has never finished outside the top two.

NCAA Division II

NCAA Division III

NAIA

Two Year Colleges

See also
 List of NCAA schools with the most NCAA Division I championships
 List of sport awards
 Capital One Cup
NATYCAA Cup

References

External links
 
 Learfield IMG College Directors' Cup Current Standings
 National Association of Collegiate Directors of Athletics
 Learfield IMG College Directors' Cup Previous Scoring

College sports trophies and awards in the United States
Awards established in 1993